Bonnie and Ben Rhyme Again is a 2018 children's picture book by Mem Fox and illustrated by Judy Horacek. In this book, a sequel to Good Night, Sleep Tight, two children, Bonnie and Ben, recite some nursery rhymes to their friend, Skinny Doug, while going for a walk.

Publication history
 2019, USA, Beach Lane Books 
 2018, Australia, Scholastic Australia

Reception
A review in Booklist of Bonnie and Ben Rhyme Again wrote: "The classics are showcased while the contemporary story celebrates them within a playful context. The illustrations feature simple, pleasing ink drawings, brightened with cheerful watercolors".

Bonnie and Ben Rhyme Again has also been reviewed by School Library Journal, Reading Time, Kirkus Reviews, and The New York Times.

See also
 Good Night, Sleep Tight

References

External links

 Library holdings of Bonnie and Ben Rhyme Again

Australian picture books
2018 children's books
Picture books by Mem Fox